Bristol Central was a parliamentary constituency in the  city of Bristol.  It returned one Member of Parliament (MP)  to the House of Commons of the Parliament of the United Kingdom.

The constituency was created for the 1918 general election, and abolished for the February 1974 general election.

Boundaries
1918–1950: The County Borough of Bristol wards of Central East, Central West, Redcliffe, St Augustine, St James, St Paul, and St Philip and Jacob South.

1950–1955: The County Borough of Bristol wards of Easton, Knowle, Redcliffe, St Paul, St Philip and Jacob North, and St Philip and Jacob South.

1955–1974: The County Borough of Bristol wards of Easton, Knowle, St Paul, St Philip and Jacob, and Windmill Hill.

Members of Parliament

Election results

Elections in the 1910s

Elections in the 1920s

Elections in the 1930s

Elections in the 1940s

Elections in the 1950s

Elections in the 1960s

Elections in the 1970s

 Constituency abolished 1974, absorbed into Bristol North East and Bristol South East.

See also
 1943 Bristol Central by-election

References
 

Central
Parliamentary constituencies in South West England (historic)
Constituencies of the Parliament of the United Kingdom established in 1918
Constituencies of the Parliament of the United Kingdom disestablished in 1974